Artamène ou le Grand Cyrus is a novel sequence, originally published in ten volumes in the 17th century. The title pages credit the work to French writer Georges de Scudéry, but it is usually attributed to his sister and fellow writer Madeleine. At 1,954,300 words, it is considered one of the longest novels ever published.

"Scudery’s major classical references and source-material comes from Herodotus’ Histories and Xenophon's Cyropaedia.  Other sources include Plutarch, Justin, Polyaenus, Pliny, Ovid, Strabon, and the Bible." However, it is a roman à clef about contemporary personages.

References

External links
 Artamène.org: the entire novel available online
 Artamene and Ibrahim
  contemporary English translation

1649 novels
1650s novels
17th-century French novels
Roman à clef novels
Cultural depictions of Christina, Queen of Sweden